Super League XXVIII is the 2023 season of the Super League, and 128th season of rugby league in Great Britain. The season began on 16 February 2023.

The full fixture list was released on 3 November 2022, with newly promoted Leigh Leopards set to take on Salford Red Devils, whilst defending champions St Helens, will only begin their season in round 2, due to their involvement in the World Club Challenge.

All times (including matches played in France) are UK local time; GMT (UTC±00:00) until 26 March, BST (UTC+01:00) thereafter.

Regular season

Round 1

Round 2

Round 3

All fixtures are subject to change

Round 4

All fixtures are subject to change

Round 5

All fixtures are subject to change

Round 6

All fixtures are subject to change

Round 7

All fixtures are subject to change

Round 8 (Rivals Round/Easter Weekend)

Round 9

Round 10

Round 11

Round 12

Round 13

Round 14 (Magic Weekend)

Round 15

Round 16

Round 17

Round 18

Round 19

Round 20

Round 21

Round 22

Round 23

Round 24

Round 25

Round 26

Round 27

Notes

References

2023 in English rugby league
Super League XXVIII